Sergei Aleksandrovich Konkov (born May 30, 1982) is a Russian professional ice hockey winger who is currently an unrestricted free agent. He most recently played for Traktor Chelyabinsk of the Kontinental Hockey League (KHL).

He made his professional debut in the top tier Russian Superleague in the 2002-03 season with HC CSKA Moscow, before moving and most notably playing with HC Neftekhimik Nizhnekamsk and later Admiral Vladivostok in the KHL.

References

External links

1982 births
Living people
Admiral Vladivostok players
HC CSKA Moscow players
HC Dynamo Moscow players
HC Neftekhimik Nizhnekamsk players
HC Sibir Novosibirsk players
Ice hockey people from Moscow
Lokomotiv Yaroslavl players
Russian ice hockey left wingers
Traktor Chelyabinsk players